W. F. Smith and Sons Leaf House and Brown Brothers Company Building, also known as Piedmont Leaf Tobacco Co., is a historic tobacco manufacturing complex located at Winston-Salem, Forsyth County, North Carolina.  The complex includes two buildings.  The W. F. Smith and Sons Leaf House was built about 1890, and is a -story, nine bays long and three bays wide, stuccoed brick building with a stepped gable facade.  The former Brown Brothers building, was built between 1890 and 1895, and is a five-story brick building with a mansard roof and hip roof dormer windows. By 1900 both buildings housed tobacco prizeries.

It was listed on the National Register of Historic Places in 1978. It is located in the Winston-Salem Tobacco Historic District.

References

External links
DigitalForsyth: Piedmont Leaf Tobacco Plant Strike, 1946

Tobacco buildings in the United States
Industrial buildings and structures on the National Register of Historic Places in North Carolina
Industrial buildings completed in 1895
Buildings and structures in Winston-Salem, North Carolina
National Register of Historic Places in Winston-Salem, North Carolina
Historic district contributing properties in North Carolina